Fast Friends is a novel by British author Jill Mansell, about three school friends reunited after several years apart.

Background
Jill Mansell first had the idea for the book after reading an article in a magazine about women who had changed their lives by becoming best-selling authors. Eventually she decided to write the kind of book "I would love to read". The end result was Fast Friends.

Plot summary 
Fast Friends is a romantic comedy from author Jill Mansell. The story begins when housewife and mother Camilla Stewart impulsively invites her old school friends for dinner. However, Roz Vallender and Loulou Marks are no ordinary guests. Camilla soon discovers that her husband Jack has been having an affair and she decides to make some changes in her life. With a little help from her friends, Camilla finds out that life in the fast lane is a lot more fun and that the future holds plenty of surprises.

Characters in Fast Friends
 Camilla Stewart 
 Roz Vallender 
 Loulou Marks

Release details 
 1991, UK, Bantam Press, pub date 14 February 1991, hardback (First edition)
 2006, UK, Headline Review, pub date 4 September 2006, paperback
 2008, UK, Headline Review, pub date 10 February 2008, E-book

References

1991 British novels
Bantam Press books
Romantic comedy novels
British romance novels
Contemporary romance novels